Cardiocondyla is an Old World genus of ants in the subfamily Myrmicinae.

Distribution
Approximately 70 species are currently recognized as belonging to this genus, most of which are distributed in the Old World tropics and subtropics, but a few of which occur in the temperate zone. Some species are also found widely separated in North America and the Pacific Islands, as a result of human introduction.

Description
Several species of this genus have a striking male polymorphism, with both winged and wingless forms. These males differ not only in morphology, but also in reproductive tactics. Closely related genera are Leptothorax, Stereomyrmex and Romblonella.

Outbreeding

Cardiocondyla elegans worker ants transport young queen ants to alien nests to promote outbreeding.    This allows avoidance of inbreeding depression.  The worker ants, sisters of these queens, may transport the queens several meters from their natal nest and drop them off at another, alien nest to promote outbreeding with wingless stationary males in a process somewhat analogous to third party matchmaking in humans.  After mating during the winter, the sexual females may depart in the spring and found their own colonies.

Species

Cardiocondyla atalanta Forel, 1915
Cardiocondyla batesii Forel, 1894
Cardiocondyla bicoronata Seifert, 2003
Cardiocondyla brachyceps Seifert, 2003
Cardiocondyla breviscapa Seifert, 2003
Cardiocondyla britteni Crawley, 1920
Cardiocondyla bulgarica Forel, 1892
Cardiocondyla carbonaria Forel, 1907
Cardiocondyla cristata (Santschi, 1912)
Cardiocondyla elegans Emery, 1869
Cardiocondyla emeryi Forel, 1881
Cardiocondyla fajumensis Forel, 1913
Cardiocondyla gallagheri Collingwood & Agosti, 1996
Cardiocondyla gallilaeica Seifert, 2003
Cardiocondyla gibbosa Kuznetsov-Ugamsky, 1927
Cardiocondyla goa Seifert, 2003
Cardiocondyla humilis (Smith, 1858)
Cardiocondyla insutura Zhou, 2001
Cardiocondyla israelica Seifert, 2003
Cardiocondyla jacquemini Bernard, 1953
Cardiocondyla kagutsuchi Terayama, 1999
Cardiocondyla koshewnikovi Ruzsky, 1902
Cardiocondyla kushanica Pisarski, 1967
Cardiocondyla littoralis Seifert, 2003
Cardiocondyla longiceps Seifert, 2003
Cardiocondyla longinoda Rigato, 2002
Cardiocondyla luciae Rigato, 2002
Cardiocondyla mauritanica Forel, 1890
Cardiocondyla melana Seifert, 2003
Cardiocondyla minutior Forel, 1899
Cardiocondyla monardi Santschi, 1930
Cardiocondyla nana Seifert, 2003
Cardiocondyla neferka Bolton, 1982
Cardiocondyla nigra Forel, 1905
Cardiocondyla nigrocerea Karavaiev, 1935
Cardiocondyla nivalis Mann, 1919
Cardiocondyla nuda (Mayr, 1866)
Cardiocondyla obscurior Wheeler, 1929
Cardiocondyla opaca Seifert, 2003
Cardiocondyla opistopsis Seifert, 2003
Cardiocondyla papuana (Reiskind, 1965)
Cardiocondyla paradoxa Emery, 1897
Cardiocondyla paranuda Seifert, 2003
Cardiocondyla parvinoda Forel, 1902
Cardiocondyla persiana Seifert, 2003
Cardiocondyla pirata Seifert & Frohschammer, 2013
Cardiocondyla rugulosa Seifert, 2003
Cardiocondyla sahlbergi Forel, 1913
Cardiocondyla sekhemka Bolton, 1982
Cardiocondyla semirubra Seifert, 2003
Cardiocondyla shagrinata Seifert, 2003
Cardiocondyla shuckardi Forel, 1891
Cardiocondyla sima Wheeler, 1935
Cardiocondyla stambuloffii Forel, 1892
Cardiocondyla strigifrons Viehmeyer, 1922
Cardiocondyla tenuifrons Seifert, 2003
Cardiocondyla thoracica (Smith, 1859)
Cardiocondyla tibetana Seifert, 2003
Cardiocondyla tiwarii Ghosh, Sheela & Kundu, 2005
Cardiocondyla tjibodana Karavaiev, 1935
Cardiocondyla ulianini Emery, 1889
Cardiocondyla unicalis Seifert, 2003
Cardiocondyla venustula Wheeler, 1908
Cardiocondyla weserka Bolton, 1982
Cardiocondyla wheeleri Viehmeyer, 1914
Cardiocondyla wroughtonii (Forel, 1890)
Cardiocondyla yemeni Collingwood & Agosti, 1996
Cardiocondyla yoruba Rigato, 2002
Cardiocondyla zoserka Bolton, 1982

References

 Emery, C. 1869: Enumerazione dei Formicidi che rinvengonsi nei contorni di Napoli. Annali dell'Accademia degli Aspiranti Naturalisti, (2)2: 1-26.

External links

Myrmicinae
Ant genera
Taxa named by Carlo Emery
Taxonomy articles created by Polbot